The men's team foil was one of seven fencing events on the fencing at the 1948 Summer Olympics programme. It was the seventh appearance of the event. The competition was held from 30 July 1948 to 31 July 1948. 82 fencers from 16 nations competed.

The competition format continued the pool play round-robin from prior years. Each of the four fencers from one team would face each of the four from the other, for a total of 16 bouts per match. The team that won more bouts won the match, with competition potentially stopping when one team reached 9 points out of the possible 16 (this did not always occur and matches sometimes continued). If the bouts were 8–8, touches received was used to determine the winning team. Pool matches unnecessary to the result were not played.

Rosters

Argentina
 José Rodríguez
 Fulvio Galimi
 Manuel Torrente
 Félix Galimi

Belgium
 Georges de Bourguignon
 Henri Paternóster
 Édouard Yves
 Raymond Bru
 André Van De Werve De Vorsselaer
 Paul Valcke

Canada
 Robert Desjarlais
 Georges Pouliot
 Alf Horn
 Roland Asselin

Denmark
 Ivan Ruben
 Ole Albrechtsen
 Aage Leidersdorff
 Tage Jørgensen
 Ivan Osiier
 Flemming Vögg

Egypt
 Osman Abdel Hafeez
 Salah Dessouki
 Mahmoud Younes
 Mohamed Zulficar
 Hassan Hosni Tawfik
 Mahmoud Abdin

Finland
 Kauko Jalkanen
 Nils Sjöblom
 Erkki Kerttula
 Heikki Raitio

France
 André Bonin
 Jéhan Buhan
 Jacques Lataste
 René Bougnol
 Christian d'Oriola
 Adrien Rommel

Great Britain
 René Paul
 Arthur Smith
 Harold Cooke
 Emrys Lloyd
 Pierre Turquet
 Luke Wendon

Greece
 Athanasios Nanopoulos
 Stefanos Zintzos
 Ioannis Karamazakis
 Konstantinos Bembis

Hungary
 Béla Bay
 Aladár Gerevich
 József Hátszeghy
 Lajos Maszlay
 Pál Dunay
 Endre Palócz

Ireland
 Owen Tuohy
 Patrick Duffy
 Tom Smith
 Nick Thuillier

Italy
 Edoardo Mangiarotti
 Manlio Di Rosa
 Renzo Nostini
 Giuliano Nostini
 Giorgio Pellini
 Saverio Ragno

Netherlands
 Willem van den Berg
 Henny ter Weer
 Frans Mosman
 Eddy Kuijpers

Switzerland
 Gottfried von Meiss
 Roger Stirn
 Walo Hörning
 Corrado Schlaepfer
 Jean Rubli

United States
 Daniel Bukantz
 Dean Cetrulo
 Dernell Every
 Silvio Giolito
 Nate Lubell
 Austin Prokop

Uruguay
 Daniel Rossi
 Jaime Ucar
 Sergio Iesi
 Juan Paladino
 César Gallardo

Results

Round 1

The top two teams in each pool advanced to round 2.

Pool 1

France and Egypt each won their bouts against Ireland without losing a single bout; the two victorious teams advanced without playing each other.

Pool 2

Italy and Uruguay each won their bouts against Greece; the two victorious teams advanced without playing each other.

Pool 3

Cuba withdrew before competition, resulting in Argentina and Finland advancing without any matches played.

Pool 4

Hungary and the United States each won their bouts against Switzerland; the two victorious teams advanced without playing each other.

Pool 5

Austria and Brazil both withdrew before competition, leaving Belgium and Canada to advance without any matches being played..

Pool 6

Denmark and Great Britain each beat the Netherlands; the two victorious teams advanced without playing each other. The match between Great Britain and the Netherlands was decided by hits against, with Great Britain winning 58 to 63.

Round 2

The top two teams in each pool advanced to round 2.

Pool 1

France and the United States each won their bouts against Canada without losing a single bout; the two victorious teams advanced without playing each other.

Pool 2

Italy and Argentina each won their bouts against Finland; the two victorious teams advanced without playing each other.

Pool 3

This was the only preliminary round pool to require the full set of three matches to be played. Belgium defeated Great Britain, 12–4. Great Britain defeated Denmark, 10–6. Belgium then beat Denmark, 9–3, to eliminate the Danes and secure advancement for the Belgians and British.

Pool 4

Hungary and Egypt each won their bouts against Uruguay; the two victorious teams advanced without playing each other. The match between Hungary and Uruguay was decided by hits against; Hungary won, 60–66.

Semifinals

The top two teams in each pool advanced to the final.

Semifinal 1

In the first pairings, Italy defeated Argentina 11–5 while Belgium beat Hungary 10–6. In the second round of matches, the same teams won—this time, Italy over Hungary 9–2 while Argentina withdrew after the first bout went to Belgium.

Semifinal 2

France won its two bouts, 13–3 over Egypt and 10–6 over Great Britain. Great Britain had its second 8–8 match of the tournament, this time losing on hits against to the United States, 60–64.The United States also beat Egypt, 9–5, to advance along with France.

Final

France (11–5 over the United States) and Italy (11–5 over Belgium) started off with wins. They swapped opponents in the second set of bouts and each won again (France 9–5 over Belgium and Italy 9–2 over the United States). That set up the Belgium–United States match as a de facto bronze medal match and the France-Italy match as the gold medal match. The Belgians defeated the Americans 9–7 to earn bronze. The France vs. Italy match resulted in 8 bouts won apiece. France prevailed on hits against, 60–62.

References

Foil team
Men's events at the 1948 Summer Olympics